In the Key of the Universe is a studio album by Joey DeFrancesco, released March 1, 2019. The album received a Grammy Award nomination for Best Jazz Instrumental Album.

Reception 

All About Jazzs Chris Mosey called In the Key of the Universe "an important, even historic album" for featuring Pharoah Sanders' "return from oblivion", and that without Sanders, "the album would be just one more round of Hammond organ tunes that adhere to DeFrancesco's dictum 'I just like to swing.'" AllMusic's Matt Collar said that "While DeFrancesco has always played with an earthy soulfulness, on In the Key of the Universe he elevates that soulfulness to a divine musical plane." DownBeats Jim Macnie says "there's an exquisite flow to the entire program."

Track listing

Personnel 
Musicians
 Joey DeFrancesco – organ, keyboards (1-3, 5-8, 10), trumpet (7, 10), arrangement (6)
 Billy Hart – drums
 Troy Roberts – tenor saxophone (3-5, 8-10), soprano saxophone (1, 8), alto saxophone (2), acoustic bass (6, 7)
 Sammy Figueroa – percussion (1, 2, 5-7, 9, 10)
 Pharoah Sanders – tenor saxophone (5-7), vocal (6)

Technical
 Clarke Rigsby – recording engineer, mixing engineer
 Nathan James – mastering engineer
 Chris Muth – vinyl mastering
 Gloria DeFrancesco – production manager
 Shannon Moore – product manager
 Raj Naik – design
 Daniel B. Holeman – cover
 Michael Woodall – photography
 Maria Ehrenreich – creative director
 Gretchen Valade – executive producer
 Will Wakefield – A&R

References

2019 albums
Joey DeFrancesco albums
Billy Hart albums
Pharoah Sanders albums
Mack Avenue Records albums
Jazz albums by American artists